The Paris Marathon is an annual marathon hosted by the city of Paris, France.  It is the marathon with the second-most finishers in the world, behind the New York City Marathon.

The marathon begins along the Champs-Élysées, runs southeast through the city to the Bois de Vincennes, heads back through the city along the River Seine, and finishes on Avenue Foch.

History

Tour de Paris era 
The first Paris Marathon, the Tour de Paris Marathon, took place in 1896. A big crowd gathered to watch 191 participants.

The distance of 40 km was chosen as it was the distance separating Marathon from Athens. The current distance of the race is 42.195 km, which the IAAF established in 1921 as the standard length of a marathon, following the 1908 Olympic race in London.

This first race was won by Len Hurst from England who crossed the finishing line in 2 hours, 31 minutes and 30 seconds.  His prize money was 200 francs.

Some sources, including the Association of Road Racing Statisticians, consider Frenchwoman Marie-Louise Ledru as the first female to race the now-defined marathon distance of 42.195 km, as she set a time of 5 hours and 40 minutes during the 1918 edition of the Tour de Paris, while other sources, including the International Association of Athletics Federations, credits Violet Piercy as the first to do so.

Current era 

The present Paris Marathon dates from 1976.  It is normally held on a Sunday in April and is limited to 50,000 runners. It is organised by the Amaury Sport Organisation. It is notable for the attractive route through the heart of the city of Paris.

Unlike most other marathons, but like all races in France, the Paris Marathon requires a doctor's note no more than a year old, stating that there is "no contraindication to competitive running".

Course 

The race starts on the Avenue des Champs-Élysées going downhill to circle round the Place de la Concorde before turning right onto Rue de Rivoli. The route passes the Louvre, then goes round the Place de la Bastille, and down Boulevard Soult to the Bois de Vincennes. A long loop of the Bois de Vincennes returns the route into the heart of Paris. The halfway point is reached at Rue de Charenton. The route now follows the course of the Seine, passing Île de la Cité and going under the Pont Neuf, then a series of tunnels. There is a large drinks station and foot massage at Trocadéro, opposite the Eiffel Tower. The route continues along the Seine, before branching off east to eventually pass through Bois de Boulogne, emerging for the final 200 metres and the finish on the Avenue Foch.

Race summaries

2021 

The 2021 edition of the race was postponed to  due to the pandemic, before registration opened.

2020 
The 2020 edition of the race was originally postponed due to the coronavirus pandemic, rescheduled for the autumn on 15 November 2020, before being cancelled in August.  Registrants were given the option of transferring their entry to 2021, obtaining a voucher of equivalent value, or obtaining a refund after 18 months.

2019 
The race took place on Sunday, April 14, 2019. Abraha Milaw took the men's title in 2 h 07 min 05 sec, a personal best. He prevented Paul Lonyangata, who finished in third place, from claiming a third successive title. Gelete Burka took the women's title with a time of 2 h 22 min 47 sec, leading home an all Ethiopian podium.

2018 
The race was run on April 8, 2018. Paul Lonyangata became the first men's runner in 28 years to claim back-to-back Paris marathon titles after he successfully defended his crown in a time of 2 h 06 min 25 sec. Kenya retained the women's title too, as Betsy Saina raced to victory in 2 h 22 min 56 sec, just three seconds ahead of countrywoman and silver medalist, Ruth Chepngetich.

2017 
The race was run on April 9, 2017. The top male finisher was Kenyan Paul Lonyangata in a time of 2 h 06 min 10 sec. The top female finisher was Kenyan Purity Rionoripoe with a time of 2 h 20 min 55 sec. 42483 participants started the race, 41736 finished it.

2016 
On April 3, 2016, the men's race was won by Cyprian Kotut, who stopped the clock at 2:07:11 for his first marathon win. The top four finishers in the men's race were Kenyan. In the women's race, Visiline Jepkesho, again from Kenya, came home first in 2:25:53.

2015  
The race was run on April 12, 2015. The top male finisher was Kenyan Mark Korir in a time of 2 h 05 min 48 sec. The top female finisher was Ethiopian's Meseret Mengistu with a time of 2 h 23 min 26 sec.

2014 
The race was run on April 6, 2014. The top male finisher, Ethiopian Kenenisa Bekele, broke the course record with a debut time of 2 h 05 min 04 sec. Bekele's winning time is the sixth-fastest debut in history on a record eligible course, and it was also the fastest ever debut by someone older than 30. The top female finisher was Kenya's Flomena Cheyech, finishing in a time of 2 h 22 min 44 sec.

2008 
The race was run on April 6, 2008. The top male finisher, Ethiopian Tsegaye Kebede,  just missed the course record with a time of 2 h 06 min 40 sec. The top female finisher was Kenya's Martha Komu finishing in a time of 2 h 25 min 33 sec. Her partner, Frenchman Simon Munyutu, qualified for this year's Olympics with a time of 2 h 09 min 24 sec.  The handisport race was won was by Mexico's Saul Mendoza in a time of 1 h 32 min 27 sec over France's Denis Lemeunier and Heinz Frei of Switzerland. 29,706 competitors started the race.

2007 

The race was run on April 15, 2007. The top male finisher was Shami Mubarak from Qatar in a time of 2:07:19 narrowly beating Frenchman Paul Astin who was trained by the legendary "Mursalese" (despite his short stature, Mursalese was a renowned long-distance runner having broken the Bangladeshi marathon record in 1993). The top female finisher was Tafa Magarsa from Ethiopia in a time of 2:25:08. Handisport race was won by Kurt Fearnley in 1:30:45.A runner who also ran in London's British 10K that year.  28,261 competitors started the race.

2006 

The race was run on April 9, 2006. The top male finisher was Gashaw Melese from Ethiopia in a time of 2:08:03. The top female finisher was Irina Timofeyeva from Russia in a time of 2:27:02.She also ran later in the British 10K. South African Ernst Van Dyck won the Handisport race in 1:33:58.

2005 
The 29th Paris Marathon was run on 10 April 2005.  The top male finisher was Kenyan runner Salim Kipsang with a time of 2h08'02, followed in by fellow Kenyan Paul Biwott 13 seconds later.  The top female finisher was Lydiya Grigoryeva in 2h27'00.  Ernst Van Dyck won the Handisport race in a time of 1h23’17.

2004 

The top male finisher was newcomer Ethiopian Ambesse Tolossa in a time of 2:08:56. This was the Ethiopian's 9th ever marathon and he beat the race favourite - Kenya's Raymond Kipkoech who came in at 2:10:08. The fastest female was Kenyan runner Salina Kosgei (also a newcomer on the event) in 2:24:32, ahead of Ethiopian Asha Gigi and France's Corrine Raux. Switzerland's Heinz Frei won the wheelchair event in 1h37'43. 30,430 competitors started the race.

2003 

The top male finisher was Kenyan Mike Rotich with a time of 2:06:33, setting a new record for this event. Coming in second, France's Benoît Zwierzchiewski equalled the existing European record, at 2:06:33. The fastest female was Kenyan runner Béatrice Omwanza in 2:27:41, ahead of Italy's Rosaria Console.

France's Joel Jeannot won the wheelchair event.

Winners 

Key:
  Course record
  French championship race

By nationality

Tour de Paris Marathon

Notes

References

List of winners

External links

 Official Paris Marathon Site 
 MarathonGuide.Com
 Marathon de Paris Website (English Version)

Athletics in Paris
Marathons in France
Recurring sporting events established in 1896
Recurring events disestablished in 1903
Recurring sporting events established in 1976
1896 establishments in France
1903 disestablishments in France
1976 establishments in France
Annual sporting events in France
Spring (season) events in France